Harry Edward "Buddy" Jeannette (September 15, 1917 – March 11, 1998) was an American professional basketball player and coach.

Jeannette was widely regarded as the premier backcourt player between 1938 and 1948. He was named to the First Team of the National Basketball League (NBL) four times, and won titles with the NBL's Sheboygan Red Skins in 1943 and Fort Wayne Pistons in 1944 and 1945.  Jeannette also won a title with the American Basketball League's Baltimore Bullets in 1947.

Most of his playing career came prior to the formation of the modern National Basketball Association (NBA) or its predecessor leagues; however Jeannette did serve three years as a player-coach for the original Baltimore Bullets of the Basketball Association of America (BAA).  In the 1948 BAA playoffs, he became the first player-coach to win a professional championship.  After his playing career ended in 1950, he coached the original Bullets for one more season.  He then became the head coach at Georgetown University for four seasons, leading the team to an appearance in the 1953 National Invitation Tournament.

Jeannette returned to the ranks of professional coaching in the NBA to lead the modern Baltimore Bullets twice, once for a full season and once as an interim coach.  He later would coach the American Basketball Association's Pittsburgh Pipers for part of a season.

In 1994, Jeannette was enshrined in the Naismith Memorial Basketball Hall of Fame. Jeannette attended Washington and Jefferson College, in Washington, Pennsylvania.

BAA/NBA career statistics

Regular season

Playoffs

Head coaching record

Sources

Notes

References

Further reading

External links

 

1917 births
1998 deaths
American men's basketball coaches
American men's basketball players
Baltimore Bullets (1944–1954) head coaches
Baltimore Bullets (1944–1954) players
Basketball coaches from Pennsylvania
Basketball players from Pennsylvania
Cleveland White Horses players
Detroit Eagles players
Fort Wayne Zollner Pistons players
Georgetown Hoyas men's basketball coaches
Guards (basketball)
Naismith Memorial Basketball Hall of Fame inductees
National Basketball Association championship-winning head coaches
National Collegiate Basketball Hall of Fame inductees
People from New Kensington, Pennsylvania
Pittsburgh Pipers coaches
Player-coaches
Sheboygan Red Skins players
Sportspeople from the Pittsburgh metropolitan area
Washington & Jefferson Presidents men's basketball players